The 2018 Mid-American Conference men's basketball tournament was the post-season men's basketball tournament for the Mid-American Conference (MAC). Tournament first-round games were held on campus sites at the higher seed on March 5. The remaining rounds were held at Quicken Loans Arena in Cleveland, Ohio between March 8–10, 2018. Regular-season champion Buffalo defeated Toledo in the championship game to win the tournament and receive the conference's automatic bid to the NCAA tournament.  There they defeated Arizona before losing to Kentucky.

Seeds
All 12 MAC teams participated in the tournament. Teams were seeded by record within the conference, with a tiebreaker system to seed teams with identical conference records. The top four teams will receive a bye to quarterfinals.

Schedule

Bracket

* denotes overtime period

All-Tournament Team
Tournament MVP – Wes Clark, Buffalo

References

2018
Tournament
MAC men's basketball tournament
MAC men's basketball tournament
Basketball competitions in Cleveland
College sports tournaments in Ohio
2010s in Cleveland